The Japan Institute of Architects (JIA; , Nihon kenchikuka kyōkai) is a voluntary organization for architects in Japan, and an affiliated organization of the Union Internationale des Architectes (UIA). The institution was founded in May 1987 and includes round about 4,100 members today.

The former Japanese architect associations, the Japan Architects Association (JAA) and the Japan Federation of Professional Architects Association (JFPAA) were merged into the JIA in 1987. The JIA's principal aim is to define and promote the social and legal status of professional architects in Japan. The association consists of the ten regional chapters Hokkaidō, Tōhoku, Kantō-Kōshin'etsu, Tōkai, Hokuriku, Kinki, Chūgoku, Shikoku, Kyūshū and Okinawa.

Honors of the JIA 
 JIA Award
 JIA Grand Prix
 JIA Young Architect Award
 JIA Sustainable Architecture Award
 JIA 25 Years Award (every two years)
 JIA Architect of the Year

External links 
 JIA

Architecture in Japan
Architecture-related professional associations
Professional associations based in Japan